Bernard Raphael Morris (born May 29, 1985) is an American football quarterback who is a free agent. He was signed as a street free agent by the Arkansas Twisters in 2009. He played college football for the Marshall Thundering Herd.

Early years 
Morris was born on May 29, 1985 in Orlando, Florida to Marcia Morris. He played high school football, basketball and baseball at Jones High School in Orlando. In basketball, he averaged nine points per game and 10 rebounds per game. While in football he ended up being named the offensive player of the year after throwing for 1,179 yards with 14 touchdowns in his senior year.

College career

College career statistics

Professional career 
Morris was rated the 12th best quarterback in the 2008 NFL Draft by NFLDraftScout.com.

Arkansas Twisters 
Morris was assigned to the Arkansas Twisters on December 15, 2008 along with ex-Florida State quarterback, Xavier Lee. In the first round of the 2009 af2 season playoffs, Morris fumbled against the Boise Burn which was returned 32 yards for a touchdown. Arkansas ended up losing the game, 77–36.

Jacksonville Sharks 
Following AF2's ceasing of operations in September 2009, Morris signed with the Jacksonville Sharks of Arena Football League on January 6, 2010.

Pittsburgh Power 
Bernard Morris signed with the expansion Pittsburgh Power of the Arena Football League on September 27, 2010. He made his starting debut March 11, 2011 against the Philadelphia Soul. He was placed on injured reserve March 20 with a sore arm.

Jacksonville Sharks 
On March 23, 2012, Morris re-signed with the Sharks for the 2012 AFL season.

Orlando Predators 
On February 10, 2014, Morris was traded to the Orlando Predators along with Matt Marcorelle and Trevis Turner for Aaron Garcia. Morris announced his retirement on October 11, 2016.

Washington Valor 
On October 14, 2016, Morris's rights were acquired by the Washington Valor during the dispersal draft. He was placed on refused to report on March 15, 2017 and activated from refused to report on March 21, 2017.

Monterrey Steel
Morris signed with the Monterrey Steel on May 24, 2017. He played in 4 games for the Steel, completing 51 of 79 passes for 607 yards, 13 touchdowns, and 3 interceptions. He also rushed for 88 yards and 4 touchdowns.

AFL statistics

Stats from ArenaFan:

References

External links 
Jacksonville Sharks bio 
Marshall Thundering Herd bio 
postgazette.com 

1985 births
Living people
American football quarterbacks
Arkansas Twisters players
Jacksonville Sharks players
Marshall Thundering Herd football players
Monterrey Steel players
Orlando Predators players
Jones High School (Orlando, Florida) alumni
Pittsburgh Power players
Players of American football from Orlando, Florida
Washington Valor players